Janusz Bałdyga was born in 1954 in Lublin, Poland. He works as a performance artist and creates installations. In 1974, he started his studies in painting at the Academy of Fine Arts in Warsaw and graduated in the studio of prof Stefan Gierowski in 1979. Bałdyga has been active in the fields of performance art, installations, objects and drawing since the beginning of his professional journey.

While Bałdyga was still occupied with painting as his medium, an object and actions performed on it became a basic characteristic of Baldyga's artistic language. For example, Some of his paintings like a duplicated map of Poland were to be encountered later in his street performances. Since he joined the Akademia Ruchu theatre in 1979, he constantly has combined visual art and performances. Sometimes you can see his sculptural installations as a scenography of his performances in which you can see the documentation of his earlier action in those objects. He mentioned: “I don’t see any absolute border between performance as a gesture and object of the performance as an effect of the gesture”

In the eighties, he started to employ and relate to some elements of visual information: sings, colors and simple drawings. He referred to the complex network of visual information that was transparent, unified and ideologically controlled.

Later on performance art has become the main focus of Janusz Bałdyga’s artistic activity. Over many years of practice, he has developed a unique style, characterized by the downsizing of the language and means of articulation by using simple elements to create elementary structures. He says "Performance art, often combined with object, drawing or elements of installation art, constitutes the core of my artistic practice. Writing about performance art, I highlight its fundamental, yet often ignored, educational aspect. Performance is an open discipline, constantly revealing the process of its own creation, facing artists with strongly articulated self-education tasks."

Bałdyga uses solid materials such as wood or metal for creating his objects. At the same time that his constructions look very light – like they can move any second– they contain a constant tension inside. Sometimes the slight touch can agitate the inner balance and literally destroy the construction. “I think about the mistake as an important factor in creating the event” – Janusz Bałdyga says. Therefore it can be assumed that the deconstruction which causes a revaluation of the existing state of the incidents is part of the artist’s conception.
We can summarize that Bałdyga’s work is elegant and minimalist. It is being stripped of everything except the necessaries. Although his works reach a high degree of abstraction, yet it remains poignant, political and present. The space and rhythm of Janusz Bałdyga’s work lead the audience more aware of the symbolic weight of each gesture.

As the artist says himself, "I am not a commentator but the creator of a particular situation which, being located in a specific space and time, cannot be free from sociopolitical references".

Currently, Janusz Bałdyga is a professor of performance art at the University of Arts in Poznan.

Selected individual exhibitions
2017 - Ephemerides - Propaganda Gallery - Warsaw, Poland

2016 - Pole Dance - Entropia Gallery - Wroclaw, Poland

2015 - Unease - UP Gallery - Berlin, Germany

2014 - "Lecture performance" - Galeria Racze - Poznan, Poland

2013 - Balance.pl - Efremova 26 Gallery - Lviv, Ukrain

2011 - Thrown Flags - AT Gallery - Poznan, Poland

2009 - Be careful glass – ODA – Piotrków Trybunalski, Poland

2008 - Marked places 08 – Centre of Contemporary Art. – Warsaw, Poland

2006 - Marked places - Wschodnia Gallery – Lodz, Poland

2003 - Ad Depositum – Otwarta Pracownia – Krakow, Poland

2001 - Ultra Vires - Excessive burden - Avantgard Gallery - Wroclaw, Poland

2000 - Open fractures - Interdruck Schipper Patitz - Lipsk, Poland

1999 - Steps and shadows - QQ Gallery - Krakow, Poland

1999 - Steps - Center for Contemporary Art Ujazdowski Castle - Warsaw, Poland

1998 - Steps - Donguy Gallery - Paris, France

1998 - Steps - Manhattan Gallery- Lodz, Poland

1998 - Neue Kunst Im Hagenbucher - Heilbronn, Germany

1997 - Stillstand - E-Werk Freiburg, Germany

1996 - Horizontal result - Wschodnia gallery - Lodz, Poland

1996 - Projections - Water-tower - Bydgoszcz, Poland

1995 - Pages and projections - Galeria GI - Zielona Gora, Poland

1995 - Performance on an empty plinth - ON Gallery - Poznan, Poland

1994 - Pages - Galeria AR - Warsaw, Poland

1993 - Column projection - Galeria Laboratorium, Centre of Modern Art - Warsaw, Poland

1991 - Inclinations - Old Gallery - Lublin, Poland

1988 - 1/2 of a pyramid - Moltkerei Werkstatt - Cologne, Germany

1988 - 1/2 even performance - East Gallery - Lodz, Poland

1985 - Equilibrium - Equivalence - Kunststation, Kleinsassen, Germany

Group exhibitions
2014 - Right of way - Manhattan Gallery. Łódź, Poland (curator, performance)

2014 - Gogol Fest - Kyiv, Ukrain (lecture)

2014 - Stairs - Kyiv, Ukrain (performance)

2014 - Photo object - Gorna Gallery. Kielce, Poland (object)

2014 - Future of Imagination 9 - Singapore (performance)

2014 - The week of art - Dzyga. Lviv, Ukraine

2014 - Open City - Lublin, Poland

2014 - International Art Festival "Interakcje"- Piotrków Trybunalski, Poland (curator, performance)

2013 - Dialogues - Włodzimierz Borowski - Kasyno Gallery - Podkowa Leśna, Poland (documentation, symposium)

2013 - La Bas - Taidehalli Helsinki - Helsinki, Finland (performance)

2013 - Photo object - Propaganda Gallery - Warsaw, Poland (object)

2013 - Days of performance art - Dzyga - Lviv, Ukrain (workshop, performance)

2013 - Undisclosed territory #7 - Laboratory Performance Art Plesungen - Solo, Indonesia (workshop, performance)

2013 - International Art Festival "Interakcje"- Piotrków Trybunalski, Poland (performance)

2013 - Fais ou tu es, pratiques contextuelles entre la Pologne - Le Lieu - Quebec City, Canada (performance)

2013 - Contexts 2013 - The 3rd International Sokolovsko Festival of Ephemeral Art

2013 - NIPAF - Nippon International Performance Art Festival - Tokio, Osaka, Nagano

2013 - Interactions 13 - Piotrków Trybunalski, Poland

2012 - Open City - Lublin, Poland

2011 - SCOPE Miami 2011 - Miami, USA

2011- Acción!MAD 2011 - Matadero - Madrid, Spain

2011 – Performing the Exhibition – Kunstverein Konstanz, Chateau Mercier - Sierre, Switzerland

2011 – Polish Roots – New Territories – Glasgow, Scotland

2009 – Performance Platform Lublin – OSP Lublin, Poland

2009 – Open City – Art in public space – Lublin, Poland

2009 – Performance Arsenał – Arsenał Gallery – Białystok, Poland

2008 – Polski Broch – Tel Aviv, Israel

2008 – Mediations Biennale – Poznań, Poland

2008 – UT – 21 Lillehammer

2008 - Differences//Interaction – CCA - Warsaw, Poland

2007 – El arte es accion – Centro de Arte Reina Sofia – Madrid, Spain

2007 – ArtSwap 07 – Kunsthale Bergen, Norway

2007 - ZAZ International Performance Art. Festival – Tel Aviv, Israel

2006 - EPAF - CSW Warsaw, Poland

2006 - Days of performance art. – Kyiv, Ukraine

2006 - Mentality – Lodz Biennale, Poland

2006 - I P Art. – Turbine Giswil Switzerland

2005 - TIPAF – Taipei Taiwan

2005 – Interaction 7 International Art Action Festival – Piotrkow Trybunalski, Poland

2004 – Recontre Internationale D’art. Performance de Quebec – Quebec City, Canada

2004 – Private Impact – Szczecin, Poland

2002 - Dialog II - eca - Edinburgh, Scotland

2001 - Collection IV – Centre of Contemporary Art - Warsaw, Poland

2001 - Navinki '01 - Minsk, Belarus

2000 - Zusammenkunst - Wiesbaden, Germany

1999 - Navinki '99 - Minsk, Belarus

1999 - Generations - Polish Art of the End/Beginning of the Century - Saint Petersburg, Russia

1998 - the 2nd International Art Encounters - Katowice, Poland

1997 - Glances - BWA Lublin, Poland

1995 - Oikos - Municipal Museum, Bydgoszcz, Poland

1995 - IMMS `95 - the Azores (Portugal)

1994 - Videospaces - PGS, Sopot

1994 - Oronsko Symposium - Centre of Polish Sculpture, Oronsko, Poland

1993 - Intercity Art Project Vienna - Lodz, Galerie Theuretzbacher - Viena, Austria

1991 - The roads of European culture - Lodz, Bratislava, Brussels, Berlin

1990 - Points east - Third Eye Centre - Glasgow, Scotland

1990 - Construction in process - Łódź, Poland

1989 - Art as a private gesture - BWA Koszalin

1985 - Process and Construction - Munich, Germany

1984 - Intellectual Trend in Polish Art After World War II - BWA Lublin, Poland

1983 – Records – BWA Lublin, Poland

1979 - Unidentified activity - STK, Lodz and Labirynt Gallery, Lublin, Poland

1978 – I AM Performance – Remont Gallery- Warsaw, Poland

References 

1954 births
Living people
Artists from Lublin